Bounds Creek is a stream in Wayne County in the U.S. state of Missouri. Bounds Creek is a tributary of Hubble Creek.

Bounds Creek has the name of Isaac and Stephen Bounds, pioneer citizens.

See also
List of rivers of Missouri

References

Rivers of Wayne County, Missouri
Rivers of Missouri